Atilla Aybars Garhan (born 17 May 1991) is a Turkish footballer who plays as a forward for TFF Third League club Hacettepe 1945 SK. He made his Süper Lig debut on 23 October 2011 for Ankaragücü.

References

External links
 
 
 

1991 births
Footballers from Ankara
Living people
Turkish footballers
Turkey youth international footballers
Association football forwards
MKE Ankaragücü footballers
Kardemir Karabükspor footballers
Adana Demirspor footballers
1461 Trabzon footballers
Fatih Karagümrük S.K. footballers
24 Erzincanspor footballers
Ofspor footballers
Gölcükspor footballers
Süper Lig players
TFF First League players
TFF Second League players
TFF Third League players